Stibara tetraspilota is a species of beetle in the family Cerambycidae. It was described by Frederick William Hope in 1840. It is known from Thailand, Myanmar, India, and Vietnam.

References

Saperdini
Beetles described in 1840